Harihara Iyer Balasubramaniam (10 April 1932 – 2 April 2021) was an Indian translator and multilingual scholar in Hindi, Tamil, Malayalam, Sanskrit and English. Balasubramaniam translated Tolkaappiyam and the poems of Subramania Bharati into Hindi.

He died from COVID-19 during the COVID-19 pandemic in India.

Early life
Balasubramaniam was born on 10 April 1932, in Kayamkulam municipal village of Alappuzha district in present day Kerala. Father S.Harihara Iyer and mother P.Sivakami Ammal migrated to Thiruvananthapuram from Azhvarkurichchi of Tenkasi district, Tamil Nadu. Balasubramaniam’s younger brothers are H. Parameswaran  and H. Padmanabhan were also multilingual scholars and were involved in Translation works. Younger sister Alamelu Krishnan is also a multilingual scholar and involved in translation works. He was also awarded Sahitya Akademi Award.

Contributions to Hindi and Tamil literature

 ‘Jaag Utha Hai Kalbhairav (Hindi)’, a collection of poetry, Neeraj Book Centre, Delhi. (2000)
 ‘Kamyabi Ki Dastaan: Nalli, (Biography of Nalli Kuppusamy Chettiar in Hindi) Brain Bank, Chennai. (2008)
 Chinnappa Bharati Varga chetanaa ke jujhaaroo sahityakar - Compilation, (2011)
 Inthiya Mozhi Ilakkiya katturaikal (Tamil), Collection of 9 essays published in various books and magazines), New Century Book House, Chennai. (2014)

Translation works

Tamil to Hindi
 Kumari Nilacantan’s ‘August 15’ as ‘agast 15’, Notion Press, Chennai (2019)
 Stalin Gunasekaran’s ‘Viduthalai velviyil tamizhagam’ as ‘Swatantrata yagya men Tamil Nadu’, Manitam pathippakam, Erode  (2020)

Hindi to Tamil
 Chandrasekhar Rath’s Novel ‘Yantrarudh’ as ‘Yanthira Vahanan’ Sahitya Akademi, New Delhi. (2007)
 Amritlaal Naagar (Monograph by Shrilaal Shukla) Sahitya Academi, (2016)

Edited Tamil to Hindi
 Uttar aur Dakshin: Sanskritik Samanvay (study) NCBH, Chennai (2017)
 Bindu mein Sindhu, Vairamuthu’s poem, Sahitya Sahakar, Delhi. (2017)
 Vairamuhtu hone ka matalab, Abhivyakti Prakashan, Delhi (2017)

Notable awards
 Translation Prize for Tamil, Sahitya Akademi, New Delhi. (2002)
 Kendriya Hindi Sansthan, Hindi Seva Samman conferred by the President of India (2011)

References

External links

1932 births
2021 deaths
Indian translators
Translators from Hindi
Translators to Hindi
Translators from Tamil
Translators to Tamil
People from Alappuzha district
Deaths from the COVID-19 pandemic in India
Recipients of the Sahitya Akademi Prize for Translation